Enea Bortolotti (28 September 1896 – 22 June 1942) was an Italian mathematician born in Rome.

Biography
He graduated in mathematics in 1920 at the Universities of Pisa, where he was a student of Luigi Bianchi. He taught analytic  and descriptive geometry at the Universities of Cagliari and Florence. He was mainly involved in differential geometry: it was a specialist in the theory of linear connections.

Notes

External links
An Italian short biography of Enea Bortolotti in MATEpristem online.

1896 births
1942 deaths
Differential geometers
20th-century Italian mathematicians
University of Pisa alumni